Flashback is a steel roller coaster of shuttle design currently operating at Six Flags New England. The ride has one train with a capacity of twenty-eight riders, two across in each row. When the coaster starts, the train is pulled backwards up the lift hill, then dropped through the loading gate into a cobra roll and then one loop. At the end of this cycle, the train is pulled up the lift hill at the end of the track. It is then released, allowing the train to traverse the track in the opposite direction. The ride is an off-the-shelf Vekoma Boomerang design common in many amusement parks.

History

The ride started out at Star Lake Amusement Park in Zhaoqing, China, but was sold soon after opening, Before it moved to Six Flags New England, the roller coaster was located at Kentucky Kingdom where it was known as The Vampire, with its controversial slogan "Give blood at your local park". The ride opened at Kentucky Kingdom on June 13, 1990, when the park reopened after being closed for two seasons. Kentucky Kingdom was bought by Premier Parks in late 1997 and merged to become Six Flags in 1998, renaming the park to Six Flags Kentucky Kingdom in June 1998. The ride continued to operate at the park until 1999, when it experienced multiple breakdowns. It was later closed and dismantled in 1999 and was moved to Six Flags New England, where it was renamed Flashback and opened to the public in May 2000.

See also
 Boomerang (roller coaster)
 Boomerang: Coast to Coaster

References

External links
Flashback's page on Six Flags New England official site
Flashback's page on Six Flags Over Texas official site

Roller coasters introduced in 2000
Roller coasters operated by Six Flags
Six Flags New England
Boomerang roller coasters
Roller coasters introduced in 1990
Amusement rides that closed in 1999
1990 establishments in the United States